Ponderosa Park is a populated place in Yavapai County, Arizona, United States. 
The area was homesteaded in 1884 and contains about 300 homes. The homes vary in design from small seasonal cabins to large year-round homes. The name is derived from the prominent ponderosa pines in the National Forest.

Geography
It is located in a valley split by Indian Creek which flows into the Hassayampa River.

Water
The community has no local government (other than the Yavapai County government). Water service is provided by a public water district. The district, known as the Ponderosa Park Water Improvement District operates five shared ground water wells in the community that are used to fill two storage tanks ( to maintain constant pressure through the distribution system. The district is funded both by monthly fees to all properties receiving water from the system as well as a property tax assessment on all properties located within the district.

Fire protection
Ponderosa Park is served by the Central Yavapai Fire District (CYFD). Station 56 is located just outside the community and houses Engine 56, a 1982 Ford Van Pelt carrying 750 gallons and Water Tender 56, a 1980 GMC carrying 1250 gallons. This is a reserve station and is not staffed. A firefighter/EMT lives on the property and when not working a shift at a staffed station, may be able to respond to calls within the community. If no one is available, CYFD has an Automatic Aid agreement City of Prescott Fire Department ensuring that the closest fire truck will respond to an emergency regardless of geographical jurisdiction.

History
On December 13, 1884, Frederich Barth was granted Homestead Certificate No. 82, Application No. 200 signed by Chester A. Arthur, President of the United States. This Homestead was for  that now comprises Ponderosa Park.

Barth died in 1889 with no heirs and no will.  In 1902, the Territory of Arizona filed claim to take possession of the land as there were no known claims to it, no tenants or others in actual possession.  Notice of the court action, scheduled for June 2, 1902 was published in local newspapers.

Ownership of the property from 1902 until the 1940s is unclear.  It is believed that the original homestead was divided and resold an unknown number of times.  M. Adele and Lenord F. Albrecht bought pieces of the original property beginning on August 15, 1941, and by October 1951, the Albrechts had title to just about the entire Ponderosa Park area. Right-of-way grants were issued for Transmission lines from the United States Forest Service and the Bureau of Land Management in 1954, 1956, and 1959.  The property was subdivided into individual lots between 1954 and 1967. Lot prices were $2000 - $3000 in the 1960s.

Geology
Ponderosa Park is composed of Proterozoic (Precambrian) "Undifferentiated Granites and Schists."

Located between the Chaparral Shear Zone on the south and the Mesa Butte Shear Zone on the north, there are light-colored granites (Aplite to Granodiorite), Diorite, Gabbro, Gneisses, Schists, Metasedimentary and Metavolcanic rocks. On one tributary to Indian Creek to the east, over 15 different types of granite and metamorphic rocks can be found. These rocks were metamorphosed (altered by heat under tremendous pressure) about 1.75 to 1.8 billion years ago. The rocks themselves are older; in the order of 2.0 billion years ago.

Community

There is a community picnic area for use by residents. It is named Mike Brockert Memorial Park in honor of a long-time resident and community volunteer.

References

Populated places in Yavapai County, Arizona